The Annunciation is a c.1500 oil-on-canvas diptych by Giovanni Bellini and his studio assistants. Each of the two canvases measures 224 by 105 cm and they are both now in the Gallerie dell'Accademia in Venice. They were produced as external doors covers for organ at Santa Maria dei Miracoli, Venice – on their reverses were St Peter (also in the Gallerie dell'Accademia) and St Paul (lost).

References 

1500 paintings
Paintings by Giovanni Bellini
Paintings in the Gallerie dell'Accademia